Secret Valley is an Australian children's television adventure series first shown on the ABC in 1980. It was produced by the Grundy Organisation in association with Telecip, S.A. and Spain's public broadcaster Televisión Española.

Series synopsis 
Secret Valley is a fictitious children's holiday camp in Bildarra which has been transformed from a run-down ghost town into a resort. The children who work and visit the camp often find themselves in battle against a gang of bad kids – Spider McGlurk and his gang from "Spider Cave". These battles usually feature flour bombs and other food-related missiles and everyone inevitably ends up in a big mess.

Spider McGlurk and his gang are not the biggest threat to the peace at Secret Valley. Secret Valley is also under threat of closure by the local council, and property developer William Whopper (also known as 'WW') played by Hugh Keays-Byrne.

It was produced by Roger Mirams who also produced the spin-off series Professor Poopsnagle's Steam Zeppelin in 1986, amongst other programs and series.

The 1980 pilot was directed by Howard Rubie and written by Terry Bourke.

International screenings 
The series was aired in New Zealand, Spain, Greece, Italy, the UK on ITV in the 1980s, and the Netherlands in 1982/1983 by KRO television. It was also broadcast by the Dutch TV station Kindernet in 1989/1990. It was also aired in South Africa in 1983 on the state-owned SABC and translated in Quebecois French for the state-owned francophone branch of the CBC.

Production
 This program was a co-production between Australia, Spain and France (Grundy Organisation, TVE and Telecip).
 Some of the child actors in this show were real-life siblings – Beth, Miles and Simone Buchanan.
 The series was at Smokey Dawson's ranch in the Sydney suburb of Terrey Hills and also at the theme park  El Caballo Blanco.

Roger Mirams originally intended to make a series called The Ghost Town Gang at Smoky Dawson's ranch at Ingleside, which had been used to film Luke's Kingdom and Lost Islands. However bushfires went through it, and there was no ghost town so the show became Secret Valley. Thirteen days after the fire, filming started again. Producer Mirams says the overall theme of Secret Valley is depicted through kids doing their own thing in what usually is an adult world.

The theme song
The theme song "My Secret Valley" was sung to the tune of "Waltzing Matilda" and composed by Bob Young, with lyrics by series producer Roger Mirams (credited as David Phillips).

I had a dream I could ride across the mountaintops

Ride on the waves where the sea turns blue

Gum trees, some trees rise until they touch the sky

I know a place where it all comes true

Chorus:

I  know a valley, I know a valley

 My Secret Valley the world has to see

One place for children, welcome from around the world

Please come and share Secret Valley with me

Verse

Paris, London, Montreal and Amsterdam

So many friends that we want to know

From the hills of Spain to the city streets of Germany

I know a place where we all can go

Repeat chorus

Episodes
1. Big plans

2. Secret weapon

3. Battle stations

4. The horse who could dance

5. The junkman

6. The ghost of Secret Valley

7. Save the bunyip

8. The monster

9. The marvelous magnetising  machine

10. The runaway

11. Double trouble

12. The great mini bike race

13. Spanish gold

14. I spy

15. Secret Valley Bush Fire

16. Super scoop

17. Spider McGlurk Meets His Match

18. The Trojan Bull

19. A sticky situation

20. The worm turns

21. Lost in the bush

22. The pony express

23. The Bildara Bank Bust

24. The oily bird catches the worm

25. The secret valley goes to town

26. End of the rainbow

References

 iF magazine online – Inside Film

External links
  
 IMDB listing for Secret Valley
 Secret Valley at the National Film and Sound Archive

Australian children's television series
1980s Australian television series
Television series produced by The Reg Grundy Organisation
Australian Broadcasting Corporation original programming
English-language television shows